New Orleans Silversmiths is a jewelry and silverware retailer that specializes in both contemporary and antique gold jewelry, as well as antique holloware. It was established in 1938 by Karl Dingeldein, a third generation silversmith from Hanau, Germany who had emigrated to the US. The Dingeldein family's long tradition of metal work and silver manufacture, both in Germany and the U.S., is well documented. The present owners acquired the business in 1966 and for many years it has been located near the center of the French Quarter, the oldest part of the city. The shop handles new and estate silverware and jewelry.

Background
New Orleans Silversmiths is a family-owned business that sells silver products. New Orleans Silversmiths' signature items are cocktail shakers, corkscrews, sterling silver animals and antique jewelry such as  Fleur de Lis jewelry. For a brief time, the shop also sold fine silver bars, with a New Orleans Silversmiths hallmark, in 5, 10 and 25 ounce sizes.

New Orleans Silversmiths Inc. is a member of Jewelers of America.

References

External links
Official website

Retail companies established in 1938
American silversmiths
Jewelry retailers of the United States
Design companies established in 1938
1938 establishments in Louisiana